Sam Cox (born  in Marnhull, Dorset) is an English rugby union player for Viadana

Sam Cox's position of choice is as a centre. He started out at North Dorset RFC as a mini. He moved on to play for Bath and Bristol in the Guinness Premiership. Before moving to Viadana in the Italian league.
The 2010/2011 Season has seen Sam return to England to make a handful of appearances for Dings Crusaders in the National 2 South League before moving up to the Championship with Birmingham and Solihull Bees.

He has caps for England U18s and U21s.

References

External links
Bristol Rugby profile

1980 births
Living people
Bath Rugby players
Birmingham & Solihull R.F.C. players
Bristol Bears players
English rugby union players
Rugby union players from Dorset